Gold and Silver (Spanish:Oro y plata) is a 1934 Mexican drama film directed by Ramón Peón and starring Carmen Guerrero, Adolfo Girón and Alfredo del Diestro.

The film's art direction was by Fernando A. Rivero.

Cast
 Carmen Guerrero as Maruca  
 Adolfo Girón as Rubén del Castillo  
 Alfredo del Diestro as Don Ridrigo 
 Domingo Soler as Juan Antonio  
 Julio Villarreal as Don Ricardo del Castillo  
 Beatriz Ramos as Violeta  
 Antonio R. Frausto as Lencho  
 Dolores Camarillo as Pareja de Lencho  
 Paco Martinez as Pedro, criado  
 Pepe Martínez as Juan 
 Manuel Tamés as Basilio  
 Pedro Nava F. as Cura 
 Felipe de Flores as José 
 Fabio Acevedo as Simón 
 A.L. Rocha as Colás  
 Alfonso Sánchez Tello 
 Ricardo Marrero 
 El Trío Maya 
 Chel López
 Carmen Torreblanca

References

Bibliography 
 Emilio García Riera. Historia documental del cine mexicano: 1929-1937. Universidad de Guadalajara, 1992.

External links 
 

1934 films
1934 drama films
Mexican drama films
1930s Spanish-language films
Films directed by Ramón Peón
Mexican black-and-white films
1930s Mexican films